The International Journal of Sociology is a bimonthly (since 2019, 1971-2018 quarterly) peer-reviewed academic journal that covers the field of sociology. It was established 1971 and is published by Taylor and Francis. The journal's editor-in-chief is Markus Hadler (University of Graz).

Abstracting and indexing 
The journal is abstracted and indexed in:

 Academic OneFile
 Academic Search Complete
 ArticleFirst
 Association for Asian Studies
 Bibliography of Asian Studies
 Business Source Corporate
 Communication and Mass Media Complete
 Criminal Justice Collection
 CSA Environmental Sciences & Pollution Management Database
 CSA Social Services Abstracts
 CSA Sociological Abstracts
 Current abstracts
 De Gruyter Saur
 Dietrich's Index Philosophicus
 EBSCOhost
 Electronic Collections Online
 Emerging Sources Citation Index
 E-psyche
 Expanded Academic ASAP
 FRANCIS
 Gale
 General OneFile
 InfoTrac Custom
 International Bibliography of Periodical Literature (IBZ)
 National Library of Medicine
 OCLC
 PAIS International
 Periodicals Index Online
 Political Science Complete
 ProQuest
 Psychology Collection
 Public Affairs Index
 PubMed
 Risk Abstracts
 Russian Academy of Sciences Bibliographies
 SocINDEX
 Social Sciences Index
 Scopus
 TOC Premier
 H. W. Wilson
 Worldwide Political Science Abstracts
 Web of Science

References

External links 
 

Sociology journals
Publications established in 1971
Taylor & Francis academic journals
Quarterly journals
English-language journals